Edward D. Fast  (born June 18, 1955) is a Canadian politician who has served as the member of Parliament (MP) for Abbotsford since 2006. A member of the Conservative Party of Canada, he was Minister for International Trade and Minister for the Asia–Pacific Gateway from 2011 to 2015 under Prime Minister Stephen Harper.

Early life and career
Born in Winnipeg, Manitoba, Ed Fast moved to and grew up in Vancouver, British Columbia. After graduating from law school at the University of British Columbia in 1982, Fast co-founded the law firm currently known as Linley Welwood.  He was elected in 1985 and served two terms as an Abbotsford School Board Trustee.  He was elected to Abbotsford City Council in 1996 and served for three 3-year terms. During that time, he served as Deputy Mayor and as Chair of the Parks, Recreation & Culture Commission.

Federal politics

In government
Fast won the 2006 federal election with 63.27% of the vote as the Member of Parliament for the riding of Abbotsford on January 23, 2006. During his first term, Fast was appointed to the Standing Committee of Canadian Heritage and the Standing Committee for Transport, Infrastructure and Communities. Fast was also the Chair of the B.C. Conservative caucus.

In 2006, Fast introduced Private Member's Bill C-277 which doubles from 5 to 10 years in prison the maximum sentence for luring a child over the internet for sexual purposes.  The Bill received royal assent on June 22, 2007.  Only 2% of private member's bills are ever passed into law.

In the 2008 federal election, Fast received 30,853 votes, 63.3% of the total in Abbotsford. He served as the Chair of the Standing Committee on Justice and Human Rights and as a member of the Copyright Modernization Committee. In May 2009, Fast introduced a motion in the House of Commons to rename the Huntingdon border crossing to "Abbotsford-Huntingdon Port of Entry".  The official renaming took place on May 28, 2010, preserving the historical significance of the "Huntingdon" name while at the same time more accurately reflecting the location of the border crossing within the Fraser Valley.

From 2009–2011, Fast was the Chair of the Standing Committee on Justice & Human Rights.

Minister of International Trade
Fast was re-elected in the 2011 federal election with 32,493 votes, representing 65% of the popular vote. On May 18, 2011, Prime Minister Stephen Harper appointed Ed Fast to Cabinet to serve as Canada's Minister of International Trade.

Fast oversaw the negotiations for the Comprehensive Economic and Trade Agreement (CETA) with the European Union, which some saw as a giveaway to big pharma. As part of the newly-elected Liberal government in 2015, Chrystia Freeland one year later finalized the negotiations which had been ongoing since 2009.

Fast was also responsible for the Canada-China Promotion and Reciprocal Protection of Investments Agreement, which was signed in 2012 and came into force on 1 October 2014. This agreement ties Canada "to the terms... for a minimum of 31 years."

On 3 December 2014 Fast announced the Canada-South Korea Free Trade Agreement (CKFTA), Canada's first free trade agreement in the Asia-Pacific region.

In November 2013, Fast announced the Government of Canada's Global Markets Action Plan – a plan focusing on Canada's core strengths in priority markets through bold trade policy and vigorous trade promotion. He also released Canada's first International Education Strategy, a part of the Global Markets Action Plan, in order to attract international talent. The CBIE termed it an "ambitious strategy, with a goal to double the number of international students choosing to study here (in Canada) by 2022."

On 9 April 2014, rising on a point of order, MP Dan Harris accused Fast of making a gun gesture and saying "boom" in the direction of Nicki Ashton during Question Period. Fast denied the claim and asserted that he was pointing in the direction of the Speaker of the House of Commons. Video from the House of Commons shows Fast making a pointing gesture. After the video circulated, Minister Fast acknowledged that he had made a pointing gesture with his hand, but said that his hand gesture was misinterpreted.

Social Issues

Abortion 
Ed Fast is anti-abortion. Fast is a volunteer and member of Campaign Life Coalition (CLC). Fast voted in support of Bill C-233 - An Act to amend the Criminal Code (sex-selective abortion), which would restrict abortion access, making it a criminal offence for a medical practitioner to perform an abortion sought solely on the grounds of the child's genetic sex. Abortion Rights Coalition of Canada describes him as an anti-abortion Member of Parliament.

Conversion therapy 
On June 22, 2021, Fast was one of 63 MPs to vote against Bill C-6, An Act to amend the Criminal Code (conversion therapy), which was passed by majority vote, making certain aspects of conversion therapy a crime, including "causing a child to undergo conversion therapy."

In opposition

42nd Canadian Parliament
Following the Harper government's defeat in 2015, Fast served in the shadow cabinets of Rona Ambrose and Andrew Scheer as the critic to the Minister of Environment and Climate Change.

43rd Canadian Parliament
After being re-elected in 2019, Fast declined reappointment to Scheer's shadow cabinet. Scheer was later removed from leadership and replaced by Erin O'Toole, who on 11 February 2021 appointed Fast as his Finance critic. He replaced Pierre Poilievre who became critic for Jobs and Industry.

44th Canadian Parliament
Fast was for a brief time a member of the Industry and Technology committee, before he was appointed on 28 February 2022 by new interim CPC leader Candice Bergen to the Finance committee. He resigned as Shadow Finance Minister after criticizing Conservative leadership candidate Pierre Poilievre's plan to fire Bank of Canada director Tiff Macklem, if elected.

Personal life 
Ed and his wife Annette have lived in Abbotsford for over 40 years and have four adult daughters and twelve grandchildren. In December 2016, Fast suffered a stroke, but recovered.

Electoral record

References

External links
 Ed Fast official site
 Department of Foreign Affairs and International Trade Canada official site

|-

1955 births
Canadian Mennonites
Conservative Party of Canada MPs
Living people
Members of the 28th Canadian Ministry
Members of the House of Commons of Canada from British Columbia
Members of the King's Privy Council for Canada
People from Abbotsford, British Columbia
Politicians from Winnipeg
University of British Columbia alumni
British Columbia municipal councillors
British Columbia school board members
Lawyers in British Columbia
Peter A. Allard School of Law alumni